Virginia San Fratello (b. 1971,  Savannah, Georgia) is an American artist known for 3D printing, architecture, and ceramics. She attended North Carolina State University and Columbia University. She collaborates with Ronald Rael under the name Rael San Fratello. In 2014 Rael San Fratello received the Emerging Voices award from the Architectural League of New York. Rael San Fratello operate the venture Emerging Objects which develops 3D printed objects.

Her collaborative work is in the collection of the Museum of Modern Art, and the San Francisco Museum of Modern Art. Their series, Bad Ombres v.2, was acquired by the Smithsonian American Art Museum as part of the Renwick Gallery's 50th Anniversary Campaign.

References

1971 births
Living people
Artists from Georgia (U.S. state)
Architects from Georgia (U.S. state)
21st-century American women artists